John David may refer to:
 John David (academic), American historian
 John David (musician) (born 1946), Welsh musician and songwriter 
 John David (archbishop of Edessa)
 John Baptist Mary David (1761–1841), prelate

See also
 David John (disambiguation)